Leuciris is a genus of moths in the family Geometridae. The genus was first described by Warren in 1894.

Species
Leuciris fimbriaria (Stoll, [1781]) Suriname
Leuciris distorta (Warren, 1894) Amazon basin

References

Abraxini